Ilyanassa is a genus of sea snails, marine gastropod mollusks in the family Nassariidae, the Nassa mud snails or dog whelks.

Species
Species within the genus Ilyanassa include:
 Ilyanassa obsoleta (Say, 1822): 
 Ilyanassa trivittata (Say, 1822): synonym of Tritia trivittata (Say, 1822)

References

External links
 Stimpson W. 1865. On certain genera and families of zoophagous gasteropods. American Journal of Conchology, 1: 55-64, pl. 8-9
 L.A., Puillandre N., Utge J., Lozouet P. & Bouchet P. (2016). The phylogeny and systematics of the Nassariidae revisited (Gastropoda, Buccinoidea). Molecular Phylogenetics and Evolution. 99: 337-353
 Yang, Y.; Abalde, S.; Afonso, C. L.; Tenorio, M. J.; Puillandre, N.; Templado, J.; Zardoya, R. (2021). Mitogenomic phylogeny of mud snails of the mostly Atlantic/Mediterranean genus Tritia (Gastropoda: Nassariidae). Zoologica Scripta
 Nomenclator Zoologicus info

Nassariidae